The Volvo B9R is a rear-engined coach chassis built by Volvo.

The Plaxton Panther is built on the B9R chassis and provides 53 seats. The Sunsundegui bodywork provides a 55-seat arrangement.

See also

 List of buses

References

External links
 Volvo Buses B9R official website

B09R
Bus chassis